Rona Nishliu (born 25 August 1986) is a Kosovo-Albanian singer and songwriter. She came to international prominence after representing Albania in the Eurovision Song Contest 2012 in Baku, Azerbaijan, where she placed fifth and achieved the best placement for Albania to date.

Early life and career

2004–2012: Early life and beginnings
Rona Nishliu was raised in her birth town Mitrovica, but moved with her family to Pristina at the age of thirteen due to the political situation in her hometown. In 2004 she entered "Ethet e së premtës mbrëma" (Friday night's fevers), a similar show to Idols. She successfully passed the first rounds and entered the live shows, where she finished Top 5. After the show, she worked on Radio Blue Sky in Prishtina as a presenter.

In 2004, Rona teamed up with Vesa Luma and Teuta Kurti to enter the 43rd edition of Festivali i Këngës, for a chance to represent Albania in the 2005 Eurovision Song Contest with "Flakareshë". The trio were qualified for the final night held on 18 December 2004 but lost to Ledina Çelo who was declared the winner.

2012: Eurovision Song Contest
Nishliu represented Albania in the Eurovision Song Contest 2012 in Baku, Azerbaijan after winning the national selection on 29 December 2011 with the entry "Suus". She is the first singer from Kosovo to represent Albania in the contest. Because of the Qafa e Vishës bus tragedy, RTSH deferred the first semi-final by more than two hours on 22 May, resulting in low ratings during Nishliu's appearance. Albania used its jury votes to vote for the other 17 countries in the semi-final, and it used the jury votes again on 26 May. RTK also did not air highlights from the first semi-final due to the bus crash.
She ended up winning fifth place in the final with 146 points; Albania's best result to date. She received Albanian citizenship on 12 January 2012.

2013–present
Nishliu was committed to her humanitarian work immediately after Eurovision. She became a member of a project called "Bonu cool, mos bjer shpullë" (Be cool, don't slap!), a project that raises gender awareness. She released a song especially for this occasion called "Se vetëm zemra flet saktë" (Because only the heart speaks right) which speaks against adolescent gender violence, produced and penned by Rona herself. The song is part of a wide public awareness campaign led by the Kosovo Gender Studies Centre. It was supported and financed by the European Union.

On 18 September 2014, Rona Nishliu held a concert in Belgrade, Serbia to promote the Kosovar culture, part of the "Mirëdita, dobar dan" festival. She received a standing ovation from the public.

In 2017, she became a coach on the sixth series of The Voice of Albania.

Public image
In Albania, Kosovo, Montenegro and North Macedonia, she is known as a pop singer/musician. The audience in Pristina and Tirana know her also as an experimental jazz singer. Her interpretation is characterized with nuances of soul music influences as well. Her vocal range and interpretative power are her strongest points.

Philanthropy
Nishliu is depicted for her humanitarian spirit, taking part in numerous humanitarian concerts for the people in the need. While being a student, she organised few Humanitarian Concerts, including the one entitled to help displaced Kosovo Albanian families of Mitrovica living in poverty. In 2009 she took place as a guest lecturer in UNDP Kosovo's activity on Awareness Raising on the Importance of Volunteerism for the Youngsters in Vushtrri. She is an activist of the National Association of Autism in Kosovo, she is also a Chairperson of the Institute for Sustainability and Development of Youth in Kosovo.

Discography

Singles
"Flakareshë" (Slap) (with Vesa Luma and Teuta Kurti) 
"Të lashë" (I left you)
"Shenja" (The sign)
"Eja" (Come)
"Veriu" (The north)
"A ka arsye?" (Is there any reason?) (ft. Bim Bimma)
"Shko pastro pas saj" (Go after her)
"Zonja Vdekje" (Mrs. Death)
"Suus"
"Se vetëm zemra flet saktë" (Because only the heart speaks right)

Awards and nominations
Kënga Magjike

|-
||2006
||"Shenja"
|TV Klan Prize
|
|-
||2009
||"Humbja"
|Best Vocal
|
|}

Poli Fest Awards

|-
||2007
||"Veriu"
|First Prize
|
|}

Video Fest Awards

|-
||2008
||"Shko pastro pas saj"
|Best Pop
|
|}

Festivali i Këngës

|-
|rowspan="2"|2011
|rowspan="2"|"Suus"
|First Prize
|
|-
|Best Interpreter
|
|}

Eurovision Song Contest 2012

|-
||2012
||"Suus"
|Contestant
|
|}

Annotations

References

External links

1986 births
Living people
Albanian jazz singers
21st-century Albanian women singers
Kosovan singers
Musicians from Mitrovica, Kosovo
Eurovision Song Contest entrants of 2012
Eurovision Song Contest entrants for Albania
Kosovo Albanians
Kosovan emigrants to Albania
Festivali i Këngës winners